United Nations Security Council Resolution 39, adopted on January 20, 1948, offered to assist in the peaceful resolution of the Kashmir Conflict by setting up a commission of three members; one to be chosen by India, one to be chosen by Pakistan and the third to be chosen by the other two members of the commission.  The commission was to write a joint letter advising the Security Council on what course of action would be best to help further peace in the region.

Functions of the commission
The commission was to "investigate the facts" and to "carry out directions" given by the Security Council. The investigations were to address the allegations made by India in its letter of 1 January 1948, regarding the situation in Jammu and Kashmir. Secondly they were to address, when the "Security Council so directs", other issues raised by Pakistan in its submission on the 15 January 1948. The Pakistani allegations were wide-ranging: that India was attempting to undo the partition of India, that it was carrying out a campaign of 'genocide' against Muslims in East Punjab, Delhi and other areas, that it forcefully and unlawfully occupied Junagadh, that it obtained the accession of Jammu and Kashmir by 'fraud and violence', and that it threatened Pakistan with direct military attack.

Negotiations and aftermath
The resolution was moved by Belgium, as the Chair of the Council. It was largely influenced by the special British delegation headed by Philip Noel-Baker, the British Cabinet minister for Commonwealth Relations, sent to the United Nations for handling the Kashmir dispute.
The resolution passed by nine votes, with Ukrainian SSR and the Soviet Union abstaining.

The British delegation also sought to persuade India to accept an impartial administration in Kashmir under the auspices of the UN. The administration was to be headed by a "neutral" Chairman and Kashmir was to be under a joint military occupation under a neutral Commander-in-Chief appointed by the UN. The United States did not support these far-reaching proposals.

The British delegation intended that the UN commission would be subordinate to the Security Council, whereas the real work of formulating a settlement would be carried out in New York. Hence, despite the urgency of the situation, no moves were actually made to create the commission until after the Resolution 47 was passed by the Council in April 1948. A further eleven weeks passed before the commission could be formed and able to arrive in the Indian subcontinent. The UN diplomat Josef Korbel later had words of criticism for the delay in forming the UN commission. During the winter months, the fighting had reduced to small skirmishes. Korbel opined that the arrival of the commission before the fighting renewed in the summer months could have had a dampening effect. When the commission eventually got down to work, the political and military situation was quite different from what it had been in January–April 1948.

It was later discovered that a contributory factor for the delay was Pakistan's failure to nominate its representative on the UN commission until 30 April 1948.

See also
List of United Nations Security Council Resolutions 1 to 100 (1946–1953)
United Nations Security Council Resolution 47
United Nations Commission for India and Pakistan

Notes

References

Bibliography

External links
 
Text of the Resolution at undocs.org
Text of Resolution at the UN Official Document System

 0039
 0039
January 1948 events